Kotwal is an Indian surname. Notable people with the name include:
 Ashutosh Kotwal (born 1965), American particle physicist of Indian origin
 Jennifer Kotwal, Indian actress and model
 Kaizaad Kotwal, Indian producer, director, actor, writer and designer
 Mehboob Alam Kotwal (born 1961), writer of Bollywood film song lyrics
 Shruti Kotwal (born 1991), Indian ice speed skater

Indian surnames